The 2012 United States presidential election in Utah took place on November 6, 2012, as part of the 2012 United States presidential election in which all 50 states plus the District of Columbia participated. Utah voters chose six electors to represent them in the Electoral College via a popular vote pitting incumbent Democratic President Barack Obama and his running mate, Vice President Joe Biden, against Republican challenger and former Massachusetts Governor Mitt Romney and his running mate, Congressman Paul Ryan. 

Prior to the election, all 17 news organizations making election predictions considered this a state Romney would win, or otherwise considered as a safe red state. Utah is among the most heavily Republican states, voting for the Republican ticket in every presidential election since 1968 and all but once since 1952, and is also the only state to have a majority Mormon population, benefiting Romney, the first Mormon to head a major party presidential ticket. Romney won in a landslide, carrying 72.62% of the vote to Obama's 24.69%, a margin of 47.93% or 488,787 votes, the best raw vote margin in the state's history to date. He won every county in the state by margins of over 15%, except for Grand and Summit Counties, home to the cities of Moab and Park City, respectively. Romney flipped these counties along with Salt Lake County, where the state's largest city, Salt Lake City, is located.

With a 47.93% margin, Utah would prove to be Romney's strongest state in the 2012 election, and it would also be Romney's largest outperformance of John McCain in 2008, winning the state by almost 20 points more. Romney would go on to be elected as a United States Senator from Utah six years later in 2018 after having switched his residence to the Beehive State. Romney's vote share in Utah was also the highest of any presidential nominee in any state since Ronald Reagan's in Utah in 1984, and remains so as of 2020. Romney's landslide win would also foreshadow Utah's considerable swing to the center in the elections following. Romney, who became a heavy critic of later-President Donald Trump, played a factor in Trump's smaller 20.48% win in 2020, representing a significant decline in support for the Republican Party likely attributable to Romney's popularity among Utah voters.

As of 2020, this is the last time the Republican nominee won Utah with more than 60% of the vote, the last time any statewide candidate won 70% of the vote, as well as the last time they won every county. It is also the last election in which Salt Lake County and Summit County have voted for the Republican presidential nominee. This is also the last time Utah has been the most Republican state in the United States, and the last time Utah voted to the right of any of the following: Wyoming, West Virginia, Oklahoma, North Dakota, Idaho, Arkansas, Alabama, Tennessee, Kentucky, South Dakota or Nebraska's 3rd congressional district. This is the last time a Republican presidential candidate won 70% of the vote in any state, as well as the last time any candidate has won more than 70% of the vote in any state.

Primaries

Democratic
Due to President Barack Obama running for reelection without serious opposition from the Democratic Party in 2012, no Democratic Primary was held in Utah.

Republican

The 2012 Utah Republican presidential primary took place on 26 June 2012.  37 delegates were chosen, for a total of 40 delegates to go to the national convention, all pledged to the primary winner.

In 2008, Mitt Romney received major support from the Mormon (Latter Day Saints) and other religious population and was able to carry the state with 93.07% of the vote. Romney led the polling in 2012 and won the primary by more than a landslide, and no other candidate could either scrape past 5% of the vote, awarding him all 40 delegates.

General election

Candidate ballot access
 Willard Mitt Romney / Paul Davis Ryan, Republican
 Barack Hussein Obama / Joseph Robinette Biden, Jr., Democratic
 Ross Carl "Rocky" Anderson / Luis Javier Rodriguez, Justice
 Gary Earl Johnson / James Polin Gray, Libertarian
 Jill Ellen Stein / Cheri Lynn Honkala, Green
 Virgil Hamlin Goode, Jr. / James N. Clymer, Constitution
 Gloria Estela La Riva / Filberto Ramirez Jr., Socialism and Liberation (as stand-ins for Peta Lindsay and Yari Osorio, who may not appear on the Utah ballot due to their Constitutional ineligibility to be president and vice president)
Write-in access:
 Andre Nigel Barnett / Ken Cross, Reform

Results

Results by county

Counties that flipped from Democratic to Republican
 Grand (largest city: Moab)
 Salt Lake (largest city: Salt Lake City)
 Summit (largest city: Park City)

By congressional district
Mitt Romney won all four congressional districts, including the 4th district, which simultaneously elected a Democrat, Jim Matheson.

See also
 United States presidential elections in Utah
 2012 Republican Party presidential debates and forums
 2012 Republican Party presidential primaries
 Results of the 2012 Republican Party presidential primaries
 Utah Republican Party

References

External links
The Green Papers: for Utah
The Green Papers: Major state elections in chronological order

2012
United States President
Utah